Baiyun Temple(), built in the twelfth year (858) of the age of Dazhong (847–860) of Tang Xuanzong (810–859) in the Tang dynasty (618–907). It is listed on the culture relic preservations of Changsha, where Mao Zedong did social research in 1917. With a superbly vast outlook, it serves as an important site for Buddhist activities. It includes the Entrance, Torii, Deities Hall, Hall of the Great Heroes, Assisted dnyana, Dining Room, etc.

Name
The name of the Baiyun Temple derives from the view of temple shrouded by white clouds.

History

Tang dynasty (618–907)
In 858, in the twelfth year (858) of the age of Dazhong (847–860) of Tang Xuanzong (810–859) in the Tang dynasty (618–907), master Guang'en built Qinglin Temple in Su Rever, in Huilong Mountain.

Ming dynasty (1638–1644)
Wang Bi and his son Wang Weihan extended Baiyun Temple.

Qing dynasty (1644–1911)

In 1646, in the third year of the age of Shunzhi of Shunzhi Emperor (1638–1661), Tao Runai (1601–1683) rebuilt Baiyun Temple.

In the period of the Qianlong Emperor (1736–1796), Wanxing rebuilt Baiyun Temple. In 1763, in the twenty-eighth year of the age of the Qianlong Emperor, Qinglin Temple and Baiyun Temple were consolidated and renamed "Baiyun Temple".

In the period of the Daoguang Emperor (1821–1850), the monks rebuilt Baiyun Temple.

People's Republic of China
In 1988, the People's Government of Ningxiang rebuilt Baiyun Temple. In 1989, the Ningxiang Buddhist Association was set up in Baiyun Temple.

References

Bibliography

Buddhist temples in Changsha
Buildings and structures in Ningxiang
9th-century Buddhist temples
Religious buildings and structures completed in 858